The Lyngby culture is a proposed name for the combination of the highly similar Ahrensburg and Bromme cultures as one and the same.

References
Nationalencyklopedin

Archaeological cultures of Central Europe
Nordic Stone Age
Archaeological cultures in Belarus
Archaeological cultures in Denmark
Archaeological cultures in Germany
Archaeological cultures in Lithuania
Archaeological cultures in Poland